Dr. Mahabhashyam Chittaranjan (మహాభాష్యం చిత్తరంజన్) (born 25 August 1938) is an Indian author, composer, teacher and player of Telugu light music.  He appeared in many programs on All India Radio over a 60-year period.

Childhood and family 
Mahabhashyam Chittaranjan's father Sri. Rangachary was a retired chief engineer of All India Radio.  His mother Smt. Perin Devi was a musician and could play veena, violin, and harmonium.   He has three brothers and two sisters.

Chittaranjan  was initially trained in music by his mother and then by Sri. Putcha Subba Rao garu, father of composer Sri P.V.Sai Baba. Later, he learned music from Padma Vibhushan Dr. Mangalampally Balamurali Krishna and accompanied him in several concerts for several years.  Chittaranjan started singing in Deccan Radio, under the Nizam government from the age of eight years. He could sing very complicated songs . Mandapati Venkata Raju garu, a music composer at Radio encouraged the young boy and made him sing play back for female artistes also.

Career

Singer and Music composer 
Chittaranjan was a regular artist of radio and sang wide variety of songs. He worked under Master Venu in the Telugu film industry and was associate music director for Vidhi Vilasam. He composed and taught light music songs in the program Ee Paata Nerchukundaama and to children in the program Kalasi Paadudaam in various languages.

In 1971, Chittaranjan joined All India Radio service as music composer . He contributed numerous light music songs in Telugu and various other Indian languages. He appeared as a judge in one episode of Padutha Theeyaga. He mentored many singers.

Chittaranjan retired from All India Radio in 1997

Books 

 Lalitha Sangeetham 80 Sangeeta Saraswatha Malaya Maaruthaalu, 
 Sri Chittaranjanam - A Collection of Keertanas, Subrahmanya Tatvam, 
 Lalitha Sangeetha Sourabham.

He prepared a syllabus for a light music diploma course in Telugu University.

Personal 
Chittaranjan's wife, Dr. Smt Padmini Chittaranjan, is a lyricist.  The couple have three daughters - Vijayalakshmi, Vandana, Amrutha Valli - and a son, Srinivasa Harish.

Awards and honours 

 Kala Ratna from AP Government - 2008
 Honorary Doctorate of Philosophy from International University of Complementary Medicine, Sri Lanka

References 

http://www.surasa.net/music/lalita-gitalu
http://kinige.com/tag/Mahabhashyam+Chittaranjan
http://www.avkf.org/BookLink/display_author_books.php?author_id=1453Sri
http://www.worldcat.org/identities/lccn-no2002-53772/
http://www.chittaranjanmusic.com/

Living people
Indian male composers
Telugu-language lyricists
1938 births